José Antonio Ferrández Pomares (born 3 December 1989), commonly known as Josan, is a Spanish professional footballer who plays for Elche CF mainly as a right winger.

Club career
Born in Crevillent, Alicante, Valencian Community, Josan finished his formation with Elche CF, but made his debuts as a senior with UD Horadada in 2008, in the regional leagues. In the 2010 summer he joined Villajoyosa CF in Tercera División, but  moved to fellow league team Crevillente Deportivo – a club he already represented as a youth – in January of the following year.

In July 2011 Josan signed for La Hoya Lorca CF, also in the fourth level. He contributed with 28 appearances and six goals in the 2012–13 campaign, as his side achieved promotion to Segunda División B for the first time ever.

On 22 January 2014, Josan agreed to a move to La Liga side Granada CF, with the deal being effective in July. On 23 July he was loaned to SD Huesca in the third division, for one year.

Josan appeared in 33 matches and scored three goals for the Aragonese side, which returned to Segunda División after a two-year absence. On 15 July 2015 he signed for AD Alcorcón, also in the second tier.

On 9 September 2015, Josan made his professional debut, coming on as a second-half substitute for Fede Vega in a 1–0 home loss against SD Ponferradina, for the season's Copa del Rey. On 28 December, after failing to make a league appearance for the club, he was loaned to UCAM Murcia CF until June.

After achieving promotion to the second tier with the Universitarios, Josan had his contract automatically renewed on 7 June 2016. On 8 August, however, he left the club and signed for Albacete Balompié, achieving another third level promotion.

On 30 December 2017, Josan cut ties with Alba, and signed for Elche CF in the third division the following day.

Career statistics

Club

References

External links

1989 births
Living people
People from Crevillent
Sportspeople from the Province of Alicante
Spanish footballers
Footballers from the Valencian Community
Association football wingers
La Liga players
Segunda División B players
Tercera División players
UD Horadada players
Villajoyosa CF footballers
Crevillente Deportivo players
Lorca FC players
Granada CF footballers
SD Huesca footballers
AD Alcorcón footballers
UCAM Murcia CF players
Albacete Balompié players
Elche CF players